Victor Cecil Austen (30 November 1918 – 29 October 2017) was an Australian sportsman who played first-class cricket for South Australia and Australian rules football in the Victorian Football League (VFL) with Hawthorn.

Family
The son of Harold Cecil Austen (1883–1974), and Violet Hilda Austen (1891–1981), née Beer, Victor Cecil Austen was born at Kew, Victoria on 30 November 1918.

His son, the 1982 Liston Trophy winner Geoffrey Allen Austen (1953-), played senior VFL football with both Fitzroy and Collingwood, and VFA football with Preston; and both his brothers  the 1949 Brownlow Medal winner, Colin Edward Austen (1920–1995), and Albert William "Bob" Austen (1914–1999)  also played senior VFL football at Hawthorn.

Football
Austen played five games for Hawthorn in the 1942 VFL season, with the highlight coming in his second game when he kicked four goals against St Kilda at Toorak Park.

War Service
Austen served in the Royal Australian Air Force during World War II.

Cricket
Austen’s only first-class cricket match was for South Australia against Victoria at the Adelaide Oval where he struggled, taking 0/77 with the ball and making two in both of his innings. He was dismissed twice by George Tribe, a man who also played in the VFL.

See also
 List of South Australian representative cricketers

Notes

References
 World War Two Nominal Roll: Flying Officer Victor Cecil Austen (418733), Department of Veterans' Affairs.
 A705, 163/89/42: World War Two Accident Record (10 December 1942): Leading Aircraftman Victor Cecil Austen (418733), National Archives of Australia.
 World War Two Service Record: Flying Officer Victor Cecil Austen (418733), National Archives of Australia.

External links
 
  
 Cricinfo profile

1918 births
2017 deaths
Australian rules footballers from Melbourne
Kew Football Club players
Hawthorn Football Club players
Australian cricketers
Cricketers from Melbourne
South Australia cricketers
People from Kew, Victoria
Royal Australian Air Force personnel of World War II